5 ("Cinq") [] is the fifth studio album by French recording artist Alizée. Originally scheduled for release in 2012, it was finally released on 25 March 2013 by Sony Music. Its music incorporates pop styles with elements of dance-pop, rock in the form of upbeat songs, piano-driven ballads and a renewed '60s style. The name and cover of the album were announced on 3 January 2013 on Star Academy. The first single to be released from the album was "À cause de l'automne" on 4 July 2012. The album was recorded in Paris and Brussels. With Alexandre Azaria as executive producer, she collaborated with a wide range of musicians, including many whom she had not collaborated with before, such as Thomas Boulard and BB Brunes.

It debuted at 23rd place on the French Albums Chart, with first-week sales of 8000 copies. Internationally, the album charted moderately, marking career lows for Alizée. Two singles were released from the album. The first single, "À cause de l'automne" charted within the top 200 of the French-speaking countries. The second single, "Je veux bien", was released in April 2013.

Development 

In early 2011, rumours that Alizée's fifth studio album was being recorded started and about a month later it was confirmed that Alizée was among the artists who recorded a duet with Alain Chamfort, whose collaboration single "Clara veut la Lune" was released on 29 April 2012. She announced a new album scheduled for spring 2012. Later Sony announced delay of the album till the fall of 2012.

During the release of Alain Chamfort's album Elles & Lui, Alizée confirmed in an interview by off TV that she was currently recording her fifth studio album. According to Alizée, the new album was "introspective and fresh" and represent a natural continuation of her career. Later, Alizée revealed change in her style on the fifth studio album because she wanted to reach a wider audience than with her last album, which she called an "artistical and abstract experiment".

<blockquote>"My album will be amazing," said Alizée. "I'm excited. I have worked hard in the studio. Different producers with whom I'm working with really encouraged me and gave me incredible tracks and beats. It's full of fun and excitement and will be released later this year"... by <small>Alizée</small></blockquote>

On 27 June 2012, Alizée announced on a live chat that the first single of the new album would be released on 28 June 2012. The music video was shot on 15 July 2012. The name of the single is "Á cause de l'automne" (English: "Because of the Autumn"). Alizée also revealed that for the new album she was working with Jean-Jacques Goldman, BB Brunes and Thomas Boulard (singer and guitarist of French rock band "Luke"). On 30 January 2013, Alizée announced on MFM Radio that Goldman wrote two songs for the album but they would not be on the final version of the album. On 12 July, a limited collector's edition of 5 became available for pre-order.

The original release date was announced to be 1 October 2012, but on 3 September Alizée and her team announced another delay of a few weeks. On 14 September, Alizée announced on Facebook that the album had been delayed until early 2013.

On 23 October, a teaser video was published on her official YouTube channel where she confirmed the album's release to be during the first trimester of 2013. On 15 January, Alizée released the cover art of the new album, and mentioned another delay of the album. The final release date was 25 March 2013.

On 5 December, the official video for "À cause de l'automne" was released on Alizée's VEVO channel. After two days of the pre-release of 5, Alizée was already in the Top 200 of iTunes in France and Mexico.

 Promotion 

 Live performances 
Along single releases, Alizée promoted the album with various live performances on Radio, TV and various events. In September 2012 she had a DJ set in a famous Parisian night club called Complexe Kes West. On 26 October 2012 she had another set at Carré Rouge night club in Avignon and another one on 23 November at Le Chat Noir night club in Dijon.

The first public performance of À cause de l'automne was on RFM radio on 21 December 2012 where she sang it live.

On 3 January 2013 the name and the cover of the album was shown on a French TV show Star Academy, where Alizée made a guest appearance. From January she performed the song in various shows, including Soccer Beach Show in Monaco on 9 February.

On 16 June TF1 confirmed Alizée's participation for Le Tour de France 2013 opening ceremony in Porto-Vecchio on 29 June.

 Magazines 
Released in late December, the January/February 2013 issue of the French Inked magazine had an article of Alizée and featuring her on the cover page as a manacled and bloodied punk princess. Photos were taken by French photographer Julien Lachaussée.

Among other magazines, POSE Mag and Liz Magazine released articles of her.

 Singles 
The first single from the album was "À cause de l'automne". It was released on 28 June 2012 on Alizée's official website at 5pm French time. The single was released to French iTunes on 4 July 2012, exactly 12 years after the anniversary of "Moi... Lolita".

The second single from the album is "Je veux bien"'', which release Alizée confirmed on Facebook on 8 April 2013. The single was released on 22 April 2013. The single was supposed to have a music video to be released in spring 2013 but the video was never produced.

Promotional songs 

"Dans mon sac", the second extract from the album, was released on 11 February 2013 as a gift during an official online competition. Soon after, the song appeared on Alizée's official YouTube account.

Track listing

Personnel
Credits adapted from 5 liner notes.

 Artist, Vocals & Backing Vocals:Alizée (all songs)
 Producer: Alexandre Azaria
 Acoustic Guitar: Philipe Foiera (Mon Chevalier)
 Art Direction: Judith Fiori & Vincent Blaviel
 Cello: Jean-Pierre Bordoux, Karel Steylaerts & Liesbeth De Lombaert
 Chorus: Alizée (all songs) & Angie Cazaux Berthias (tracks: 10 Ans & Happy End)
 Copyist: Véronique Duval
 Executive Producer: Thomas Jacquet & Isabelle Baleanu Perisson
 Graphics: Twice (17)
 Masterised: Hubert Salou
 Mix: 
Jonathan Aharonson & Nicolas Duport (10 Ans, from Le Dernier Souffle to Si tu es un Homme)
 Jordan Kouby & Etienne Colin (Mon Chevalier, Dans Mon Sac)
 Hubert Salou (À cause de l'automne, Je veux bien, Happy End)
 Orchestra Director:  Gisèle Gérard Tolini
 Fashion Director:  Yuksel
 Makeup & Hairstyle: Elise Ollivier-Wong
 Photography:  Lachaussée
 Strings & Brass: Phil Delire & Camille Rousseau
 Assisted: Camille Rousseau
 Trombone: Frederik Heirman & Marc Godefroid
 Trumpet:  Schepers & Serge Plume
 Violin: Cristina Constantin, Dirk Uten, Eric Baeten, Francois Grietje, Hans Vandaele, Liesbeth De Lombaert, Marc Steylaerts, Patrick Heselmans, Teresa Heidel & Veronique Gilis

References

Alizée albums
Sony Music albums
French-language albums
2013 albums